Bruce Church (born February 9, 1965), better known as Bruce Bruce, is an American actor and stand-up comedian from Atlanta, Georgia. He grew up in The Bluff.

He was the host of BET's ComicView and has appeared in various stand-up comedy specials and television series. He was also a spokesman for Popeyes Chicken & Biscuits.

Filmography
 Dollar (2000)
 The Wash (2001)
 The Sunday Morning Stripper  (2003)
 Hair Show (2004)
 Larry the Cable Guy: Health Inspector (2005)
 XXX: State of the Union (2005)
 Idlewild (2006)
 Cloud 9 (2006)
 Who's Your Caddy? (2007)
 Think Like a Man (2012)
 Top Five (2014)
 Maron (2015) - Himself (1 episode)
 BET's ComicView
 The Trap (2019)
 Undercover Brother 2 (2019)

References

External links
 
 

Living people
African-American male actors
African-American stand-up comedians
American male film actors
American stand-up comedians
American male television actors
20th-century American comedians
21st-century American comedians
1965 births
20th-century African-American people
21st-century African-American people